Fanini–Wührer was an Italian professional cycling team that was active between 1984 and 1985. At the end of the 1985 season, the team merged with Murella–Rossin.

History

The team's first manager was Piero Pieroni, who stayed for only one season. The team's most successful race was the Giro d'Italia, in which they participated in both seasons, and won a stage in 1985.

Notable riders

 Stefano Tomasini 
 Franco Chioccioli

Major wins

Grand Tours

Giro d'Italia
1 stage (1 in 1985), Franco Chioccioli

References

Defunct cycling teams based in Italy
Cycling teams based in Italy
Cycling teams established in 1984
Cycling teams disestablished in 1985